Cătălin Andrei Ștefănescu (born 30 November 1994) is a Romanian professional footballer who plays as a centre midfielder for Ceahlăul Piatra Neamț.

Club career

Politehnica Iași
In August 2017, after a loan to Liga I champions Viitorul Constanța fell through, Politehnica Iași transferred Ștefănescu from FCSB on a permanent basis. The transfer fee was undisclosed and the player later signed a two-year contract with his former team.

Career statistics

Club

References

External links

1994 births
Living people
Sportspeople from Piatra Neamț
Romanian footballers
Association football midfielders
Romania under-21 international footballers
Liga I players
Liga II players
CSM Ceahlăul Piatra Neamț players
FC Steaua București players
FC Voluntari players
FC Politehnica Iași (2010) players
FC Petrolul Ploiești players
FC Universitatea Cluj players